The Chengwatana State Forest is a state forest located in Pine and Chisago counties in Minnesota. Eastern White Pine was historically the dominant tree species in the surrounding forest prior to intensive logging at the end of the nineteenth century.

The forest is part of a long corridor of protected areas along the St. Croix River, bordering the Wild River State Park to the south and the Saint Croix State Park to the north. In addition to the St. Croix, the Kettle River and Snake River both run through the park, all historically important as timber floating rivers to sawmills and timber markets downstream. The forest is primarily composed of upland boreal forest surrounded by brushlands and marshes.

Outdoor recreation opportunities include boating, canoe camping, and fishing along the rivers,
as well as hunting and picnicking throughout the forest. Trails include cross-country skiing trails,  of equestrian trails,  of mountain biking trails,  of both Class I All-terrain vehicle (ATV) and Class II ATV trails,  of off-highway motorcycling trails, as well as  snowmobiling trails.

See also
List of Minnesota state forests

References

External links
Chengwatana State Forest - Minnesota Department of Natural Resources (DNR)

Minnesota state forests
Protected areas of Chisago County, Minnesota
Protected areas of Pine County, Minnesota
Protected areas established in 1953